The 1998 FIFA World Cup qualification, CONCACAF zone ran from March 1996 to November 1997 in order to determine the three CONCACAF representatives at the 1998 FIFA World Cup. For an overview of the qualification rounds, see 1998 FIFA World Cup qualification.

A total of 30 CONCACAF teams entered the competition. Mexico, the USA, Costa Rica, Honduras, El Salvador and Canada, the six highest-ranked teams according to FIFA, received byes and advanced to the third round directly. The remaining 24 teams were divided into two zones, based on geographical locations.

Format
Caribbean Zone: The 20 teams played in three rounds of knockout matches on a home-and-away basis to determine four winners advancing to the third round. Bahamas and Bermuda withdrew before playing one game. 18 countries stay in the race.
Central American Zone: The four teams were paired up to play knockout matches on a home-and-away basis. The winners would advance to the third round.

In the third round, the 12 teams were divided into three groups of four teams each. They played against each other on a home-and-away basis. The group winners and runners-up would advance to the final round.

In the final round, the six teams played against each other on a home-and-away basis. The top three teams would qualify.

Preliminary round

|}

Group A

Dominican Republic won 6-3 on aggregate.

Group B

Grenada won 8-1 on aggregate.

Group C
The Bahamas withdrew, so Saint Kitts and Nevis advanced to the first round automatically.

Group D

Dominica won 6-4 on aggregate.

First round

|}

Group 1

Dominican Republic won 2-1 on aggregate.

Group 2

Haiti won 7-1 on aggregate.

Group 3

Note:Both matches were played in Cayman Islands.

Cuba won 6-0 on aggregate.

Group 4

Saint Kitts and Nevis won 6-1 on aggregate.

Group 5

Saint Vincent and the Grenadines won 9-1 on aggregate.

Group 6

Barbados won 2-0 on aggregate.

Group 7

Jamaica won 2-0 on aggregate.

Group 8
Bermuda withdrew, so Trinidad and Tobago advanced to the second round automatically.

Second round

|-
!colspan=6|Caribbean Zone

|-
!colspan=6|Central American Zone

|}

Caribbean Zone

Group A

This match was played on neutral ground instead of in Cuba.

Cuba won 7-2 on aggregate.

Group B

Trinidad and Tobago won 12-1 on aggregate.

Group C

Jamaica won 3-0 on aggregate.

Group D

Saint Kitts and Nevis 2-2 Saint Vincent and the Grenadines on aggregate. Saint Vincent and the Grenadines won on the away goals rule.

Central American Zone

Group E

Guatemala won 3-1 on aggregate.

Group F

Panama won 6-2 on aggregate.

Third round

Group 1

The United States and Costa Rica advanced to the final round. Guatemala played their home games in Los Angeles and San Salvador instead of at home due to FIFA stadium standards not followed by the Estadio Mateo Flores, in Guatemala City, where over 80 people died due to structural flaws and overcrowding in October 16, 1996, when the home match against Costa Rica was due to be played.

Group 2

Canada and El Salvador advanced to the final round.

Cuba played all their matches away from home.

Group 3

Jamaica and Mexico advanced to the final round.

Fourth round

Mexico, the United States, and Jamaica qualified for the 1998 FIFA World Cup.

Qualified teams
The following three teams from CONCACAF qualified for the final tournament.

1 Bold indicates champions for that year. Italic indicates hosts for that year.

Goalscorers
There were 295 goals scored in 98 matches, for an average of 3.01 goals per match.

11 goals 

 Carlos Hermosillo

9 goals 

 Raúl Díaz Arce

8 goals 

 Benjamín Galindo

6 goals 

 Paulo Wanchope
 Lázaro Darcourt

5 goals 

 Alex Bunbury
 Juan Carlos Plata
 Suazo Velázquez
 Walter Boyd
 Theodore Whitmore
 Zague
 Julio Dely Valdés
 Eric Wynalda

4 goals 

 Rónald Gómez
 Eduardo Sebrango
 Isaac Chauvet
 Deon Burton
 Andre Hinds
 Rodney Jack
 Julio Dely Valdés
 Angus Eve
 Brian McBride

3 goals 

 Derrick Edwards
 Paul Peschisolido
 Hernán Medford
 Lester Moré
 Nildeson
 Keith Fletcher
 Golman Pierre
 Paul Young
 Dwight Allers Kelley
 Stern John
 Russell Latapy
 Roy Lassiter

2 goals 

 Raymond Davelaar
 Carlo Corazzin
 Alberto Jiménez
 Dinardo Rodríguez
 Mauricio Cienfuegos
 William Renderos Iraheta
 José Carlos Rivera
 Ricky Charles
 Jason François
 Julio Rodas
 Eduardo Bennett
 Milton Núñez
 Carlos Pavón
 Enrique Reneau
 Christian Santamaria
 Andy Williams
 Luis Hernández
 Luis García Postigo
 Ricardo Peláez
 Rubén Guevara
 Víctor René Mendieta Ocampo
 Keith Gumbs
 Vernon Sargeant
 Kendall Velox
 Jerren Nixon
 Eddie Pope
 Preki
 Roy Wegerle

1 goal 

 Quentin Clarke
 Ryan Malmberg
 Gregory Goodridge
 Roger Proverbs
 Denmark Casey
 David McCaulay
 Geoff Aunger
 Eddy Berdusco
 Nick Dasovic
 Carl Fletcher
 Mark Watson
 Luis Diego Arnáez
 Javier Delgado
 Farlen Ilama
 Wilmer Lopez
 Luis Marín
 Allán Oviedo
 Mauricio Solís
 Richard Smith
 Jafet Soto
 Manuel Bobadilla
 Armando Cruz
 Alexander Cruzata
 Mario Pedraza
 George Dangler
 Anthony Dominique
 Jeffrey Edmond
 Peter Greenaway
 Shane Marshall
 Stevenson Morancie
 Pedro Aquino
 Ramón Mariano
 Nelson Peña
 Cristian Queliz
 Omar Zapata
 Waldir Guerra
 Wilfredo Iraheta
 Elías Montes
 Jorge Rodríguez
 Giovanni Trigueros
 Patrick Modeste
 Otis Roberts
 Juan Manuel Funes
 Rudy Ramirez
 Bryan Joseph
 Wilson Chevalier
 Rosemond Pierre
 Arnold Cruz
 Merlyn Membreño
 Barrios Zapata
 Peter Cargill
 Paul Davis
 Ian Goodison
 Paul Hall
 Stephen Malcolm
 Enrique Alfaro Rojas
 Damián Ariel Álvarez
 Paulo César Chávez
 Alberto García Aspe
 Joaquín del Olmo
 Ramón Ramírez
 Gijsberta Gersley
 Ezequiel Jerez
 Juan Carlos Cubillas
 Marcos Lugris
 Larrymore Bedford
 Earl Jean
 Wesley Charles
 James Chewitt
 Alwyn Guy
 Christopher Harry
 Marlos Huggins
 Everad Sam
 Anthony Rougier
 Dwight Yorke
 Thomas Dooley
 Frankie Hejduk
 Chris Henderson
 Cobi Jones
 Joe-Max Moore
 Tab Ramos
 Claudio Reyna
 Earnie Stewart

1 own goal 

 Pedro Aquino (playing against Trinidad and Tobago)
 Nicolás Ramírez (playing against the United States)
 Angel Mussenden (playing against Saint Vincent and the Grenadines)
 Dexter Walker (playing against Mexico)

Broadcasting rights

Americas 
  Canada: TSN
  Mexico: Televisa
  United States: ABC, CBS (English); Telemundo, Univision (Spanish)
  Puerto Rico:

Europe

References

 
CONCACAF
FIFA World Cup qualification (CONCACAF)
Qual
Qual
Q1
Q1
Q1